"Someday" is a song by American rock band the Strokes, written by singer Julian Casablancas. It was released on August 5, 2002, as the third and final single from Is This It (2001). It peaked at number 17 on the US Modern Rock Tracks chart and at number 27 on the UK Singles Chart. It was ranked at number 53 on Pitchfork magazine's list of the 200 Best Songs of the 2000's. In 2020, Paste and The Independent ranked the song number eight and number three, respectively, on their lists of the 20 greatest Strokes songs.

Music video
The music video for the song was directed by Roman Coppola and features appearances by Slash, Duff McKagan, and Matt Sorum (variously the guitarist, bassist, and drummer from Guns N' Roses and Velvet Revolver) as well as the members of Guided by Voices. The video also features Richard Karn as himself, while The Strokes take on Guided by Voices in a fictional game of Family Feud.

Track listing

"Alone, Together" recorded 28.02.00 - 12 am to 4 am 
"Is This It" recorded at J.P.'s House 16.02.01 - In the afternoon 
"Soma" recorded 02.04.02 at the Broadway, Reykjavik, Iceland

Charts

Certifications

Release history

Appearances in other media
This song was featured in the 2006 movie Click, starring Adam Sandler, and on the Major League Baseball 2K8 soundtrack.

It was sampled on Rhymefest's song "Devil's Pie", produced by Mark Ronson, from the album Blue Collar.

The Australian ISP iiNet frequently uses the track to "Someday" in their advertisements. As of 2018, TUI also use the song.

On January 20, 2017, Julia Jacklin covered the song on Like a Version, a program hosted by Australian radio station Triple J.

References

External links
 

2001 songs
2002 singles
Songs written by Julian Casablancas
Music videos directed by Roman Coppola
RCA Records singles
Rough Trade Records singles
The Strokes songs